The Thornton Hunt Inn is a grade II listed building and working public house in Thornton Curtis, North Lincolnshire, England.

References

Grade II listed pubs in Lincolnshire
Grade II listed buildings in North Lincolnshire
18th-century establishments in England